"Sweeter than Fiction" is a song written and recorded by American singer-songwriter Taylor Swift for the British film One Chance (2013), starring British actor James Corden. The song was written and produced by Swift and Jack Antonoff, best known as the guitarist for indie pop band Fun, and was released through Big Machine Records as a promotional single from the soundtrack album on October 21, 2013.

Background and release
The song was written and produced by Swift and Jack Antonoff. Swift revealed in an interview with country music blog Taste of Country that she viewed the film as a love story in addition to a chronicling of a man's road to success, and approached the songwriting process from that perspective: "I’m very inspired by the concept of love. And this movie is, in a lot of ways, ... a story of the love his wife … has for him," Swift explained. "That was the story that hit me and really affected me. I wanted to tell a story musically from that perspective."

The song was released to digital retailers as a promotional single from the One Chance soundtrack on October 21, 2013. After its release, Swift admitted she had to fight her label to be allowed to release "Sweeter than Fiction", as she tries to maintain a dormant period between album releases. Big Machine reportedly told Swift "no new music until the next album comes out", but Swift explained that after seeing the film, she insisted "I have to be a part of this."

Composition
"Sweeter than Fiction" is a "rock-tinged" bubblegum pop song that also contains influences of synthpop and new wave music. Critics have deemed the song reminiscent of 80's pop. The song is musically and lyrically upbeat, with Swift singing from the point of view of a longtime friend or fan who has always believed in a performer's talents. "There you'll stand, ten feet tall", Swift sings in the chorus, "and I will say, 'I knew it all along.'" It was written by Swift along with Jack Antonoff and is in the key of B major for its verses, switching to D-flat major for its choruses and the bridge. With Swift's vocal range between the octaves of F♯3 and D♭5. has a tempo of 135 beats per minute and lasts three minutes and fifty-four seconds.

Critical reception
The song was well received by critics. Entertainment Weekly praised Swift's approach to the subject matter - "The track ... is uplifting without being hokey and sweet without being cloying." - and described the song as "addictive". Rachel Mcrady of US Weekly felt "Sweeter than Fiction" possessed "all the makings of another hit" in Swift's career. MTV blogger Jenna Hally Rubenstein summarised "Sweeter than Fiction" as "a masterfully crafted pop song that should do a killer job of soundtracking any and all uplifting moments in One Chance." Carl Williott of Idolator called the song "pretty great", saying "it's a ... sweet song, but the confident synth-pop/New Wave stylings keep it from being an overly saccharine affair, resultingly in a surprisingly bold offering from Swift." Spin editor Larry Busacca gave a more mixed review. Though deriding the song for being "[not] the least bit groundbreaking", Busacca did admit the song was "too catchy and effortless-sounding to resist." In a retrospective review, music journalist Rob Sheffield of Rolling Stone called it a "warm-up for the synth-pop of 1989". In June 2022, Insider ranked "Sweeter than Fiction" as Swift's sixth best soundtrack song, calling it a "pivotal moment in Swiftian history" due to it being the first collaboration between Swift and Antonoff.

Awards and nominations
"Sweeter than Fiction" was nominated for Best Original Song at the 71st Golden Globe Awards.  This was Swift's second consecutive nomination in the category, after "Safe & Sound" the previous year.

Commercial performance
"Sweeter than Fiction" debuted at number 34 on Billboard Hot 100, her forty-third top forty hit, thus tying with Aretha Franklin for the second-most Top Forty entries among women in the chart's history. It also Swift's fifth movie song to crack the Top Forty, following "Crazier" from Hannah Montana: The Movie which reached number 17 in 2009, "Today Was a Fairytale" from Valentine's Day which reached number 2 in 2010 and two songs from The Hunger Games: "Safe & Sound" with The Civil Wars which reached number 30 in 2012, and "Eyes Open" which reached number 19 in 2012. On Hot Digital Songs, "Sweeter than Fiction" entered at number 6 with 114,000 downloads sold. It is Swift's twenty-eighth song to reach the Top Ten of the Digital Songs chart, thus tying with Rihanna for the most Top Ten hits among all acts.

Charts

Weekly charts

References

2013 singles
2013 songs
Big Machine Records singles
Bubblegum pop songs
Songs written by Jack Antonoff
Songs written by Taylor Swift
Songs written for films
Taylor Swift songs
Song recordings produced by Jack Antonoff
Song recordings produced by Taylor Swift